Ancylomenes longicarpus (also known as long-arm cleaner shrimp or anemone partner shrimp) is a species of shrimp found from the Red Sea to the Western Pacific.
Its tiny (length up to 2.5 cm) body is transparent with white and purple spots on tail and white line between eyes.
It is often associated with corals from genera Xenia, Plerogyra and anemones Entacmaea quadricolor, Heteractis crispa.

References

Palaemonoidea
Crustaceans described in 1983